Mount Alfred is a mountain located at the Queen Reach arm and head of the Jervis Inlet within the Pacific Ranges of the Coast Mountains in British Columbia, Canada. The mountain is the highest in the portion of the mainland between Jervis and Toba Inlets, with its  prominence defined by the pass at the head of the Skwawka River, which feeds the head of Jervis Inlet.

Naming
The mountain was named during the 1860 survey by  who charted all of the area and was named after Alfred Edward "Affie", who was the third child and second son of Queen Victoria and Prince Albert of England, and who was Duke of Edinburgh from his birth in 1844 until his death in 1900.

The first ascent of Mount Alfred was made in 1929 by Arthur Tinniswood Dalton and Percy Williams Easthope.

Gallery

References

External links
 CM_C2308 Fraser River to N.E.Pt. of Texada Island including Howe Sound and Jervis Inlet 'Annotated'  1863.02.16 1865.08
 Detail Map of Mt. Alfred from the 1860 Survey Map of the Jervis Inlet and Mt. Alfred.

Pacific Ranges
Two-thousanders of British Columbia
New Westminster Land District